Finish may refer to:

 Finishing (whisky), in the distillation of Scotch
 The aftertaste of an alcoholic beverage, particularly for:
 whisky
 wine
 Finished good, a good that is completed as to manufacturing but not yet sold or distributed to the end-user
 Surface finishing, various industrial processes for modifying a workpiece's surface
 Mechanical finish, processes that modify a surface using mechanical means
 Wood finishing, the process of embellishing and/or protecting the surface of wooden objects

People

 Eli Finish (born 1975), Israeli comedian

Brands

 Finish, A dishwasher detergent brand owned by Reckitt Benckiser and known as Calgonit in Continental Europe, formerly known as Electrasol.

See also
 Finishing (disambiguation)
 Finish line (disambiguation)
 Finnish (disambiguation)